Glil Yam is a kibbutz in central Israel. Located in the Sharon plain between Ramat HaSharon and Herzliya, it falls under the jurisdiction of Hof HaSharon Regional Council.

History
The kibbutz was established in 1943 by a group which had formed in 1933. The land on which the village was founded had been bought from the Arab village of Ijlil by the Jewish National Fund. Its name is mentioned in the book of Samaritans, which was also preserved in the name of the Arab village.

References

External links

 

Kibbutzim
Kibbutz Movement
Populated places established in 1943
Populated places in Central District (Israel)
1943 establishments in Mandatory Palestine